(German for "Flea Waltz") is a simple piano piece, often one of the first learned because its fingering is simple and it allows beginners to perform a piece that is harmonically and rhythmically pleasing.

Music
Despite its name, the piece is not a waltz in triple meter, as it has a time signature in duple meter and is closer to a polka or galop. The composer is unknown. In a parody of musicology writing, Eric Baumann attributes the piece to Ferdinand Loh, but this is obviously a joke ("F. Loh" = Floh, flea in German). The piece is notated in the identically sounding keys of F-sharp major or G-flat major, because most of the piece's notes are played on black keys in those keys, making the fingering easier.

International
The piece is known all over the world.

In Mexico, it is called "Los Changuitos" (The Little Monkeys), in Finland "Kissanpolkka" (Cat's Polka), in the Czech Republic "Prasečí valčík" (Pig Waltz), in Slovakia "Somársky pochod" (Donkey March), and in Korean "고양이 춤" (Cat Dance).

In China, it is called "跳蚤圆舞曲" (Flea Waltz).

In the United Kingdom, the melody is often called "Chopsticks", but it should not be confused with "Chopsticks" by Euphemia Allen.

In Taiwan, it is known as "踩到貓兒" (Stepped on a Cat).

In Chile, it is known as "La Polka de los perros" (Dogs' polka).

Arrangements
An elaborate variation on this piece, "Lesson One", was a hit in 1962 for pianist Russ Conway. Danish pianist Bent Fabric released a jazz-influenced version in 1963 as "Chicken Feed". The piece becomes even easier to play in piano four hands arrangements, but there are also quite virtuosic versions of such arrangements.

Swedish songwriter Thore Skogman used the piece as the basis for his 1962 song "" (which has since become the Swedish name for the melody in general), featuring lyrics about a man named Kalle Johansson, who gets in a love affair that involves him, his sister, and two of their neighbors.

Notes

External links
 
 "Flohwalzer" entries in the German National Library catalogue

, Jean Panajotoff
, variations and parodies by Dmitry Malikov

Compositions for solo piano
Anonymous musical compositions
Compositions in F-sharp major
Compositions in G-flat major